Doragnathus is an extinct genus of tetrapod from the Early Carboniferous of Scotland.

References

Carboniferous tetrapods of Europe
Prehistoric tetrapod genera
Mississippian animals
Basal tetrapods of Europe
Enigmatic vertebrate taxa
Fossil taxa described in 1980